Saint-Léonard-d'Aston is a municipality in Nicolet-Yamaska RCM in the Centre-du-Québec region of Quebec, Canada. The population as of the Canada 2011 Census was 2,271. The municipality is situated along Route 155, partway between Drummondville and Trois-Rivières. Autoroute 20 and a major intercity railway line, part of Canadian National Railway over which VIA Rail Canada passenger trains also operate,  cross through the town. Until the completion of the northern branch of Autoroute 55 in October 2006, Saint-Léonard-d'Aston was a common waypoint for those who travelled between Trois-Rivières and Sherbrooke.

Demographics
Population
Population trend:

Language
Mother tongue language (2006)

Attractions
Along Autoroute 20, on the Rang du Moulin-Rouge, there stood an impressive structure called the Manoir Bigfoot—also known as the Restaurant Madrid—which was notable for its bizarre decorations: large monster trucks parked outside next to a line of larger-than-life statues of dinosaurs. In 2011, plans were announced to demolish the restaurant and replace it with "Le Madrid 2.0" which would include conventional fast-food restaurants.

See also
List of municipalities in Quebec

References

External links

 Manoir Bigfoot / Restaurant Le Madrid

Municipalities in Quebec
Incorporated places in Centre-du-Québec
Designated places in Quebec
Nicolet-Yamaska Regional County Municipality